Ercolini is an Italian surname. Notable people with the surname include:

 Béa Ercolini (born 1963), Belgian multimedia journalist
 Julián Ercolini, Argentine judge
 Rossano Ercolini, Italian school teacher

See also
 Ercole (disambiguation)

Italian-language surnames